Sea Specialized Port Nika-Tera is a diversified port that provides stevedoring services for transshipment, storage, preparation, and dispatch of various goods in the region. The area of the approach channel and operating water area of the port is 67.4 hectares.

See also

List of ports in Ukraine
Transport in Ukraine

References

Ports of Mykolaiv
Companies established in 1995
1995 establishments in Ukraine
Buildings and structures in Mykolaiv Oblast
Buildings and structures destroyed during the 2022 Russian invasion of Ukraine